Islampur subdivision is an administrative subdivision of the Uttar Dinajpur district in the Indian state of West Bengal.

Subdivisions
Uttar Dinajpur district is divided into two administrative subdivisions:

Administrative units
Islampur subdivision has 5 police stations, 5 community development blocks, 5 panchayat samitis, 59 gram panchayats, 757 mouzas, 730 inhabited villages, 2 municipalities and 2 census towns. The municipalities are at Islampur and Dalkhola. The census towns are: Chopra and Hanskunda. The subdivision has its headquarters at Islampur.

Police stations
Police stations in Islampur subdivision have the following features and jurisdiction:

Blocks
Community development blocks in Islampur subdivision are:

Gram panchayats
The subdivision contains 59 gram panchayats under 5 community development blocks:

 Chopra block: Rural area consists of eight gram panchayats, viz. Chopra, Daspara, Haptiagachh, Majhiali, Chutiakhore, Ghirnigaon, Lakhipur and Sonapur.
 Goalpokhar I block: Rural area consists of 14 gram panchayats, viz. Dharampur–I, Goti, Lodhan, Sahapur–I, Dharampur–II, Goalpokhar, Mahua, Sahapur–II, Goagachh–I, Jaingaon, Panjipara, Goagachh–II, Khagore and Pokharia.
 Goalpokhar II block: Rural area consists of 11 gram panchayats, viz. Belon, Kanki, Sahapur–I, Sahapur-II, Surjapur-I, Surjapur–II, Baidyanandapur, Nijampur–I, Nijampur–II, Troyal, and Chakulia.
 Islampur block: Rural area consists of 13 gram panchayats, viz. Agdimti–Khanti, Gunjaria, Matikunda–II, Ramganj–II, Gaisal–I, Islampur, Panditpota–I, Gaisal–II, Kamalgaon–Sujali, Panditpota–II, Gobindapur, Matikunda–I and Ramganj–I.
 Karandighi block: Rural area consists of 13 gram panchayats, viz. Altapur–I,Boris mouja, jhal no-210 Dalkhola–I, Lahutara–I, Rasakhowa–II, Altapur–II, Domohona, Lahutara–II, Bazargaon–I, Karandighi–I, Raniganj, Bazargaon–II, Karandighi–II and Rasakhowa–I.

Education
Uttar Dinajpur district had a literacy rate of 59.07% (for population of 7 years and above) as per the census of India 2011. Raiganj subdivision had a literacy rate of 66.94%, Islampur subdivision 52.40%.

Given in the table below (data in numbers) is a comprehensive picture of the education scenario in Uttar Dinajpur district for the year 2012-13:

Note: Primary schools include junior basic schools; middle schools, high schools and higher secondary schools include madrasahs; technical schools include junior technical schools, junior government polytechnics, industrial technical institutes, industrial training centres, nursing training institutes etc.; technical and professional colleges include engineering colleges, medical colleges, para-medical institutes, management colleges, teachers training and nursing training colleges, law colleges, art colleges, music colleges etc. Special and non-formal education centres include sishu siksha kendras, madhyamik siksha kendras, centres of Rabindra mukta vidyalaya, recognised Sanskrit tols, institutions for the blind and other handicapped persons, Anganwadi centres, reformatory schools etc.

The following institutions are located in Islampur subdivision: 
Islampur College was established in 1973 at Islampur.
Shree Agrasen Mahavidyalaya was established in 1995 at Dalkhola.
Chopra Kamala Paul Smriti Mahavidyalaya was established in 2013-14 at Chopra.

Healthcare
The table below (all data in numbers) presents an overview of the medical facilities available and patients treated in the hospitals, health centres and sub-centres in 2013 in Uttar Dinajpur district.  
 

.* Excluding nursing homes

Medical facilities available in Islampur subdivision are as follows:

Hospitals: (Name, location, beds)
Islampur Subdivisional Hospital, Islampur, 136 beds
Rural Hospitals: (Name, CD block, location, beds)
Karandighi Rural Hospital, Karandighi CD block, Karandighi, 30 beds
Lodhan Rural Hospital, Goalpokhar I CD block, Goalpokhar, 30 beds
Chakulia Rural Hospital, Goalpokhar II CD block, Chakulia, 30 beds
Dalua Rural Hospital, Chopra CD block, Dalua, 30 beds
Primary Health Centres: (CD Block-wise)(CD block, PHC location, beds)
Karandighi CD block: Dalkhola (6), Rasakbowa (10)
Goalpokhar I CD block: Goagaon (10)
Goalpokhar II CD block: Kanki (10), Toryal (2)
Islampur CD block: Sujali (4)
Chopra CD block: Sonapur (6), Daspara (10), Lakshmipur (4)

Electoral constituencies
Lok Sabha (parliamentary) and Vidhan Sabha (state assembly) constituencies in Islampur subdivision were as follows:

References

Subdivisions of West Bengal
Subdivisions in Uttar Dinajpur district
Uttar Dinajpur district